A constitutional referendum was held in Peru on 18 June 1939. The proposed changes were approved by 88% of voters. Following the referendum, Manuel Prado Ugarteche was elected President on 4 December.

On 6 August 1945 the Congress passed a Law 10334, which declared the amendments unconstitutional, as they were not passed in line with Article 236 of the 1933 constitution.

Background
In 1933 Congress elected Óscar R. Benavides to serve the remainder of President Luis Miguel Sánchez Cerro's five-year term in office. In the 1936 presidential elections no candidate received a majority of the vote. Due to this, and one candidate being supported by the banned American Popular Revolutionary Alliance, the Electoral Tribunal later declared the election invalid. Congress subsequently extended Benavides' term until 1939 and allowed him to rule by decree.

On 19 April 1939 he issued Law 8875 calling for a referendum on constitutional reform. The changes included setting six-year terms for both the Congress (although one third of members would be elected every two years) and the President.

Results

References

1939 in Peru
1939 referendums
Referendums in Peru
Constitutional referendums